Franklin Edward Kameny (May 21, 1925 – October 11, 2011) was an American gay rights activist. He has been referred to as "one of the most significant figures" in the American gay rights movement.

In 1957, Kameny was dismissed from his position as an astronomer in the U.S. Army's Army Map Service in Washington, D.C., because of his homosexuality, leading him to begin "a Herculean struggle with the American establishment" that would "spearhead a new period of militancy in the homosexual rights movement of the early 1960s".

Kameny formally appealed his firing by the U.S. Civil Service Commission. Although unsuccessful, the proceeding was notable as the first known civil rights claim based on sexual orientation pursued in a U.S. court.

Early life and firing

Kameny was born to Ashkenazi Jewish parents in New York City. He attended Richmond Hill High School and graduated in 1941. In 1941, at age 16, Kameny went to Queens College, City University of New York to learn physics and at age 17 he told his parents that he was an atheist. He was drafted into the United States Army before completion. He served in the Army throughout World War II in Europe, and later served 20 years on the Selective Service board. After leaving the Army, he returned to Queens College and graduated with a baccalaureate in physics in 1948. Kameny then enrolled at Harvard University; while a teaching fellow at Harvard, he refused to sign a loyalty oath without attaching qualifiers, and exhibited a skepticism against accepted orthodoxies. He graduated with a master's degree (1949) and doctorate (1956) in astronomy. His doctoral thesis was titled A Photoelectric Study of Some RV Tauri and Yellow Semiregular Variables and was written under the supervision of professor Cecilia Payne-Gaposchkin.

While on a cross-country return trip from Tucson, where he had just completed his PhD thesis research, he was arrested by plainclothes police officers at a San Francisco bus terminal after a stranger had approached and groped him. He was promised that his criminal record would be expunged after serving three years' probation, relieving him from worrying about his employment prospects and any attempt at fighting the charges.

Relocating to Washington, D.C., Kameny taught for a year in the Astronomy Department of Georgetown University and was hired in July 1957 by the U.S. Army Map Service. When they learned of his San Francisco arrest, Kameny's superiors questioned him, but he refused to provide information regarding his sexual orientation. Kameny was fired by the commission soon afterward. In January 1958, he was barred from future employment by the federal government. Author Douglass Shand-Tucci later wrote,

Kameny was the most conventional of men, focused utterly on his work, at Harvard and at Georgetown... He was thus all the more rudely shocked when the same fate befell him as we've seen befall Prescott Townsend, class of 1918, decades before... He was arrested. Later he would be fired. And, like Townsend, Kameny was radicalized.

Kameny appealed against his firing through the courts, losing twice before seeking review from the U.S. Supreme Court, which declined to consider the case, turning down his petition for certiorari. After devoting himself to activism, Kameny never held a paid job again and was supported by friends and family for the rest of his life. Despite his outspoken activism, he rarely discussed his personal life and never had any long-term relationships with other men, stating merely that he had no time for them. He stated, "If I disagree with someone, I give them a chance to convince me they are right. And if they fail, then I am right and they are wrong and I will just have to fight them until they change."

Kameny eschewed conventional racial designations; throughout his life, he consistently cited his race as "human".

Gay rights activism

In 1961, Kameny and Jack Nichols, fellow co-founder of the Washington, D.C., branch of the Mattachine Society, launched some of the earliest public protests by gays and lesbians with a picket line at the White House on April 17, 1965. In coalition with New York's Mattachine Society and the Daughters of Bilitis, the picketing expanded to target the United Nations, the Pentagon, the United States Civil Service Commission, and Philadelphia's Independence Hall for what became known as the Annual Reminder for gay rights.  Kameny also wrote to President Kennedy asking him to change the rules on homosexuals being purged from the government.

In 1963, Kameny and Mattachine launched a campaign to overturn D.C. sodomy laws; he personally drafted a bill that finally passed in 1993. He also worked to remove the classification of homosexuality as a mental disorder from the American Psychiatric Association's Diagnostic and Statistical Manual of Mental Disorders.

In 1964, Kameny argued that homosexuals faced more severe discrimination than blacks because the federal government did not help them and actively discriminated against them. He suggested that homosexuals would fare worse from the success of the civil rights movement: "Now that it  is  becoming  unfashionable  to  discriminate  against  Negroes,  discrimination against homosexuals will be on the increase... Homosexuality represents the last major area where prejudice and discrimination are prevalent in this country."

Unlike other homosexual activists at the time, Kameny rejected the idea that homosexuality was inferior to heterosexuality:

Kameny further argued that homosexuality can be a social good: "I  take  the  stand  that not only is homosexuality, whether by inclination or overt act, not immoral, but that homosexual acts engaged in by consenting adults are moral, in a positive and real sense, and are right, good and desirable, both for the individual participants and for the society in which they live." Eventually, he coined the slogan "Gay is Good" after listening to Stokely Carmichael chant "black is beautiful" in 1968.

1970–2000

In 1971, Kameny became the first openly gay candidate for the United States Congress when he ran in the District of Columbia's first election for a non-voting Congressional delegate. Following his defeat by Democrat Walter E. Fauntroy, Kameny and his campaign organization created the Gay and Lesbian Alliance of Washington, D.C., an organization which continues to lobby government and press the case for equal rights.

In 1972, Kameny and Barbara Gittings convinced the American Psychiatric Association (APA) to hold a debate, "Psychiatry: Friend or Foe to the Homosexual?; A Dialogue" at their annual meeting in Dallas. It was for this debate that Dr. John E. Fryer, a gay psychiatrist in disguise as "Dr. Henry Anonymous", testified as to how homosexuality being listed as a mental disease in the APA's Diagnostic and Statistical Manual of Mental Disorders (DSM) affected the lives of gay psychiatrists and other homosexuals.  Kameny had approached numerous gay psychiatrists, but Fryer was the only one who agreed to testify, and even he would only do so in disguise for fear of losing his position at Temple University, where he did not have tenure. The following year, the APA removed homosexuality from the DSM. Kameny described that day – December 15, 1973 – as the day "we were cured en masse by the psychiatrists."

Conduct Unbecoming: Gays and Lesbians in the US Military author Randy Shilts documented Kameny's work in advising several service members in their attempts to receive honorable discharges after being discovered to be gay. For 18-year-old Marine Jeffrey Dunbar:

Kameny lined up gay ex-Marines to testify at the young man's hearing. The Washington Post ran an editorial supporting an upgraded discharge, noting that Dunbar "was involved in no scandal and had brought no shame on the Marine Corps", and called the undesirable discharge a "strange and, we think, pointless way of pursuing military 'justice'."

In 1975, his search for a gay service member with an impeccable record to initiate a challenge to the military's ban on homosexuals culminated in protégé Leonard Matlovich, a Technical Sergeant in the United States Air Force with 11 years of unblemished service and a Purple Heart and Bronze Star, purposely outing himself to his commanding officer on March 6, 1975. Matlovich had first read about Kameny's goal in an interview in the Air Force Times. Talking first by telephone, they eventually met and, along with ACLU attorney David Addlestone, planned the legal challenge. Their relationship was strained after Matlovich's interview with the New York Times Magazine, as Kameny felt that Matlovich had portrayed the gay community negatively by saying that he would have preferred to be straight.

Discharged in October 1975, Matlovich was ordered reinstated by a federal district court in 1980 in a ruling that, technically, would only have applied to him. Convinced the Air Force would create another excuse to discharge him again, Matlovich accepted a financial settlement instead, and continued his gay activism work until his death from AIDS complications in June 1988. Kameny was an honorary pallbearer at his funeral and spoke at graveside services in Washington, D.C.'s Congressional Cemetery.

On March 26, 1977, Kameny and a dozen other members of the gay and lesbian community, under the leadership of the then-National Gay Task Force, briefed then-Public Liaison Midge Costanza on much-needed changes in federal laws and policies. This was the first time that gay rights were officially discussed at the White House.

Kameny was appointed as the first openly gay member of the District of Columbia's Human Rights Commission in the 1970s.

2000–2011

In 2007, Kameny's death was mistakenly reported by The Advocate in its May 22 "Pride issue", alongside a mistaken report that he had HIV. The report was retracted with an apology, and Kameny asked The Advocate, "Did you give a date of death?"

In 2007, Kameny wrote a letter to the conservative, anti-gay publication WorldNetDaily in defense of Idaho Republican senator Larry Craig regarding Craig's arrest for solicitation of sex in a Minneapolis airport bathroom; he ended it with the following: "I am no admirer of Larry Craig and hold out no brief for him. He is a self-deluding hypocritical homophobic bigot. But fair is fair. He committed no crime in Minneapolis and should not suffer as if he did." The New York Times' Frank Rich joined Kameny in calling for Craig's pardon.

In November 2007, Kameny wrote an open letter of protest to NBC journalist Tom Brokaw (and his publisher Random House), who wrote Boom!: Voices of the Sixties Personal Reflections on the '60s and Today, over the total lack of mention of gay and lesbian rights activism during the 1960s and upbraiding Brokaw for having "'de-gayed' an entire generation". The letter was co-signed by former Washington Post editor Howard Kurtz, Harry Rubinstein (curator, National Museum of American History), John Earl Haynes, Dudley Clendinen and Stephen Bottum. Brokaw appeared on Kurtz's CNN show Reliable Sources to defend the exclusion, saying that "the gay rights movement came slightly later. It lifted off during that time and I had to make some choices about what I was going to concentrate on. The big issues were the anti-war movement, the counterculture."

Death
Kameny suffered from heart disease in his last years, but maintained a full schedule of public appearances, his last being a speech to an LGBT group in Washington, D.C. on September 30, 2011.

Kameny was found dead in his Washington home on October 11, 2011 (National Coming Out Day). The medical examiner determined the cause of death to be natural causes due to arteriosclerotic cardiovascular disease.

DC statehood activism 
In 1981, Kameny became an elected delegate  to the District of Columbia Statehood Constitutional Convention, which was an initiative towards DC statehood. He remained an advocate for DC statehood through the end of his life. A resident of the Palisades, he was a fixture at the neighborhood's annual July 4 parade.

Awards and honors
In 2006, Kameny and Barbara Gittings received the first John E. Fryer, MD Award from the American Psychiatric Association.

In 2007, the Smithsonian Institution's National Museum of American History included Kameny's picket signs carried in front of the White House in 1965 in the Smithsonian exhibit "Treasures of American History". The Smithsonian now has 12 of the original picket signs carried by gay and lesbian Americans at the first demonstration for gay rights held in front of the White House. The Library of Congress acquired Kameny's papers in 2006, documenting his life and leadership.

In February 2009, Kameny's home in Washington was designated as a Washington, D.C. historic landmark by the District of Columbia's Historic Preservation Review Board.

On June 29, 2009, John Berry (Director of the Office of Personnel Management) formally apologized to Kameny on behalf of the United States government.  Berry, who is openly gay, presented Kameny with the Theodore Roosevelt Award, the OPM's most prestigious award.

On June 10, 2010, following a unanimous vote by the Dupont Circle Advisory Neighborhood Commission, Washington, D.C. mayor Adrian Fenty unveiled new street signs designating 17th Street between P and R streets, N.W., as "Frank Kameny Way" in Kameny's honor.

At a luncheon on December 10, 2010, in the Caucus room of the Cannon House Office Building, Kameny was honored with the 2010 Cornelius R. "Neil" Alexander Humanitarian Award.

Kameny was invited to attend the December 22, 2010, ceremony where President Barack Obama signed the Don't Ask, Don't Tell Repeal Act of 2010. Kameny was a member of Triangle Foundation's Board of Advisors.

Following Kameny's death, the giant rainbow flag on the flagpole at the corner of Market Street and Castro Street in the Castro neighborhood of San Francisco was flown at half-staff for 24 hours beginning on the afternoon of October 12, 2011 at the request of the creator of the rainbow flag, Gilbert Baker.

On November 2, 2011, Kameny's house was listed on the National Register of Historic Places.

In January 2012, during its national meeting, the American Astronomical Society held a public ceremony to present a posthumous certificate of appreciation to Kameny, recognizing "his exemplary lifelong commitment to promoting equal rights for homosexual men and women" and how his "activism removed discriminatory barriers that had cut short many careers."  The recognition had been planned several months before his death, but Kameny passed before the meeting took place.  The award was accepted on behalf of Kameny by his close personal friend Mr. Charles Francis, cofounder of the Kameny Papers Project, and three LGBTQ astronomers at various career stages.

On July 3, 2012, asteroid (40463) Frankkameny was named in Kameny's honor by the International Astronomical Union and the Minor Planet Center.

In 2013, Kameny was inducted into the Legacy Walk, an outdoor public display in Chicago which celebrates LGBT history and people.

In 2015, Kameny received a U.S. Veterans Administration memorial headstone, at Washington, D.C.'s Congressional Cemetery at his memorial site; the headstone was dedicated during a ceremony on the morning of November 11, 2015, on Veterans Day. In front of the headstone is a marker inscribed with the slogan "Gay is Good". Kameny coined that slogan, and in a 2009 AP interview said about coining it, "If I am remembered for anything I hope it will be that."

In June 2019, Kameny was one of the inaugural fifty American "pioneers, trailblazers, and heroes" inducted on the National LGBTQ Wall of Honor within the Stonewall National Monument (SNM) in New York City's Stonewall Inn. The SNM is the first U.S. national monument dedicated to LGBTQ rights and history, and the wall's unveiling was timed to take place during the 50th anniversary of the Stonewall riots.

The National LGBTQ+ Bar Association presents the Frank Kameny Award annually in honor of Kameny, the only recipient of the association's Dan Bradley Award who was not a law school graduate, to a member of the LGBTQ+ community who has paved the way for important legal victories without a United States Juris Doctor.

On June 2, 2021, Kameny was featured on that day's Google Doodle in celebration of Pride Month.

References
Citations

Bibliography
 Bianco, David (1999). Gay Essentials: Facts for Your Queer Brain. Los Angeles: Alyson Books. .
 Cervini, Eric (2020). The Deviant's War: The Homosexual vs. the United States of America. New York: Farrar, Straus and Giroux. 
 Gambone, Philip (2010) Travels in a Gay Nation: Portraits of LGBTQ Americans. Madison: University of Wisconsin Press. 
 Kisseloff, Jeff (2007). Generation on Fire: Voices of Protest from the 1960s, an Oral History. Lexington: University Press of Kentucky. 
 Murdoch, Joyce and Price, Deb (2001). Courting Justice: Gay Men and Lesbians v. the Supreme Court. New York: Basic Books.

External links

Biographical
 "Frank Kameny" in GLBTQ, an Encyclopedia of Gay, Lesbian, Bisexual and Queer Culture
 Kameny Papers collection at the Smithsonian Institution
 Biography of Kameny
 Frank Kameny papers held by the Library of Congress

Congressional testimony
 Amending District of Columbia Charitable Solicitation Act, August 8, 1963, pp. 22–93, 118–19

Interviews
 Kameny on Race Questionnaires, The Straight Dope, November 22, 1991
 Interview by Jack Nichols, April 28, 1997
 An oral history of Kameny is included in the 2006 book Generation on Fire: Voices of Protest from the 1960s by Jeff Kisseloff 
 Frank Kameny on The 7th Avenue Project radio show, July 4, 2010

News
 "Signs of Progress" The Washington Post, July 23, 2005
 "Gay Is Good: How Frank Kameny Changed the Face of America" Metro Weekly, October 5, 2006
 "A Pariah's Triumphand America's", Jonathan Rauch, December 7, 2006
 "The Man Who Invented Gay Rights" CNN, December 24, 2010
 "Frank Kameny Debates Same-Sex Marriage in 1974 on 'The Advocates (VIDEO) Huffington Post, October 11, 2012
 "An Accidental Activist (online title: Frank Kameny's Orderly, Square Gay-Rights Activism" by Caleb Crain, The New Yorker, June 29, 2020

1925 births
2011 deaths
American astronomers
Jewish American atheists
American civil servants
Jewish American military personnel
American LGBT military personnel
Gay military personnel
United States Army personnel of World War II
Gay politicians
Gay scientists
Harvard University alumni
LGBT Jews
American LGBT scientists
LGBT people from New York (state)
American LGBT politicians
American LGBT rights activists
Activists from New York City
People from Washington, D.C.
Scientists from New York (state)
Mattachine Society